The Indian black turtle (Melanochelys trijuga) or Indian pond terrapin is a species of medium-sized freshwater turtle found in South Asia.

Description

Despite its name, the color of its upper shell or carapace can vary from reddish to dark brown and black with yellow streaks running along its length. The underside or plastron is uniformly brown in color. The face of this turtle may have yellow or orange marks and spots, with color varying between subspecies. The size of the species may vary from 38 to 45 cm.

Distribution and habitat
The species occurs in India, Bangladesh, Myanmar, Sri Lanka, the Maldives, Nepal, and the Chagos Archipelago, where it may have been introduced. There are five recognized subspecies with overlapping distributions:
M. t. trijuga: peninsula black turtle, India
M. t. coronata: Cochin black turtle, India
M. t. indopeninsularis: Bangladesh black turtle, India, Nepal
M. t. parkeri: Sri Lanka
M. t. thermalis: Sri Lanka black turtle, India, Maldives, Sri Lanka
The Indian black turtle inhabits a variety of water bodies including ponds, marshes streams, rivers and artificial water bodies like rice-paddies, watering holes etc.

Ecology

The species is most active during early morning and evening, spending most of the day basking in the sun. The Sri Lankan subspecies, which has a flatter carapace, tends to spend the day in burrows. The species typically forages on aquatic vegetation along the edge of the water. It is omnivorous, with a diet ranging from aquatic plants to aquatic insects and carrion. Indian black turtles may sometimes be seen to aggregate alongside the carcass of a large dead animal.

Breeding
The Indian black turtle breeds during the wet season, between August to October. During this time the male becomes particularly aggressive and starts chasing the female, biting her on the neck. The male attaches itself to the top of the female during mating. Once mating is completed, the female digs a nest in the ground or occasionally in a pile of rhinoceros or elephant dung, using the left hind leg to excavate the nest and right hind leg to clear the excess material. Two to six individual clutches of eggs are laid in burrows per year. Eggs have an incubation period of 60–65 days, hatching during summer.

Conservation
The species is classified as least concern by the IUCN. M. t. indopeninsularis is considered threatened in Bangladesh, while the population in Myanmar (M. t. edeniana) is thought to be vulnerable or endangered. The species appears still to be common in India and Nepal, and is thus overall considered reasonably secure. Where it is under pressure, this is mostly due to hunting for consumption and the pet trade.

References

Further reading
 
 
 

Melanochelys
Reptiles of India
Fauna of South Asia
Reptiles described in 1812